The indigenous small-numbered peoples of the North, Siberia and the Far East is a Russian census classification of indigenous peoples, assigned to groups with fewer than 50,000 members, living in the Russian Far North, Siberia or Russian Far East. They are frequently referred as indigenous small-numbered peoples of the North or indigenous peoples of the North.

Definition
Today, 40 indigenous peoples are officially recognised by Russia as indigenous small-numbered peoples and are listed in the unified register of indigenous small-numbered peoples (единый перечень коренных, малочисленных народов Российской Федерации). This register includes 46 indigenous peoples. Six of these peoples do not live in either the Extreme North or territories equated to it, so that the total number of recognised indigenous peoples of the North is 40. The Komi-Izhemtsy or Izvatas, a subgroup of the Komi peoples, are seeking recognition from the Russian government as a distinct indigenous people of the North.

The Far North is the part of Russia which lies mainly beyond the Arctic Circle. However, this is the smaller part of the total territories inhabited by indigenous peoples. These territories extend southward as far as to Vladivostok.

List of indigenous peoples of the North
The Unified register lists the following peoples:

See also
Demographics of Siberia
Indigenous peoples of Siberia
List of minor indigenous peoples of Russia

References

External links 
 Web.archive.org: archived Raipon.org website

 

Indigenous peoples in the Arctic
Indigenous peoples of Europe

People from Karelia
People from the Russian Far East
.
Indigenous
Lists of indigenous peoples of Russia